Weißer Turm or Weisser Turm is German for "White Tower".  It may refer to:

 Weißer Turm (Bad Homburg), also known as Schloßturm, a landmark in Bad Homburg, Germany
 Weißer Turm (Nuremberg U-Bahn) and the nearby landmark in Nuremberg, Germany
 Weißer Turm, a landmark in the Bergen-Enkheim district of Frankfurt am Main
 Weißer Turm, a landmark in Rees, North Rhine-Westphalia, Germany
 Weißer Turm, a landmark in Oberwesel, Rhineland-Palatinate, Germany

See also 
 Weißenthurm, a municipality in the district of Mayen-Koblenz, in Rhineland-Palatinate, Germany
 White Tower (disambiguation)